Gürol Karamahmut (born in 1980) is a Turkish professional basketball player. He currently plays for Mersin Büyükşehir Belediyesi.

References

1980 births
Living people
Galatasaray S.K. (men's basketball) players
Mersin Büyükşehir Belediyesi S.K. players
Turkish men's basketball players
Place of birth missing (living people)
Date of birth missing (living people)